Broad Street is a major arterial street in Philadelphia, Pennsylvania. It is Pennsylvania Route 611 along its entire length with the exception of its northernmost part between Old York Road and Pennsylvania Route 309 (Cheltenham Avenue) and the southernmost part south of Interstate 95.

Broad Street runs along a north–south axis between 13th Street and 15th Street, containing what would otherwise be known as 14th Street in the Philadelphia grid plan. It is interrupted by Philadelphia City Hall, which stands where Broad and Market Street would intersect in the center of the city.  The streets of Penn Square, Juniper Street, John F. Kennedy Boulevard, and 15th Street form a circle around City Hall at this point.  It is one of the earliest planned streets in the United States, and is listed on the National Register of Historic Places as a continuous north–south street, planned by surveyor Thomas Holme and developed for Philadelphia in 1681.

Broad Street is served by many public transit routes, including SEPTA's Broad Street Line subway and several SEPTA City Bus routes.

History 

Broad Street has gone through various changes since its beginnings in Colonial America. Thomas Holme introduced the first geographical plan of the city to William Penn in 1687. Penn intended that the center square would eventually be home to Philadelphia's City Hall. During the American Revolution, the street was often settled by troops moving in and out of the city. As the city's population grew, Broad was extended both north to Vine and south to Dickinson, eventually reaching the Delaware Waterfront, where today's Philadelphia Naval Shipyard stands. It remains Philadelphia's longest straightaway and one of the longest urban boulevards in the United States.

During the early stages of the 19th century, Broad Street was home to many wealthy residents, especially around the Rittenhouse square area. Homes were designed in Victorian and Gothic styles. South Broad became center for the fine arts with the establishment of the Academy of Music in 1857. A Masonic Temple, The Pennsylvania Academy of the Fine Arts and the Adelphi Theater were also built during the same time period. Banks and offices grew in number around center city as well as high rise structures. The corner of Spring Garden housed Baldwin Locomotive Works founded by Matthias Baldwin in 1825. Baldwin's company was one of the biggest steam locomotive producers before the transition to diesel powered trains. Broad Street's biggest addition came with the construction of City Hall intersecting Broad and Market. With the progression of the Industrial Revolution Philadelphia became a center for trade and commerce. Transportation growth gained prominence with the construction of the Broad Street Station in 1881. Social life dominated the street during the second half of the 19th century. Elaborate hotels such as the Divine Lorraine and the Majestic were centers for nightlife. Standing over 10 stories tall the Lorraine was one of the tallest residential structures in Philadelphia. Private clubs such as the Columbia and Mercantile were popular during the Gilded Age.

At the turn of the 20th century, Broad Street transformed from a bustling boulevard to a cultural magnet for music and the arts. January 1, 1901, introduced the very first Mummers Day parade which has become a staple of Philadelphia culture. Jazz and gospel gained popularity at the grassroots level due primarily to the Great Migration of the early 1900s. One such place for Jazz and Blues music was the Uptown Theater, built in 1927. By the 1950s Broad Street residential areas had been replaced with skyscrapers as well as the newly developed Penn Center. Since the 70s the street has undergone various city renovations. With $100 million in public funds Broad has received new lighting and streetscaping, restored theaters as well as new restaurants and cafes. Lamp post fixtures have been improved as well as sidewalk pavements and subway entrances. In 2015 Philadelphia Mayor, Michael Nutter, introduced a $8.7 million project to brighten North Broad with 41 stainless steel light masts.

Southern Boulevard Parkway 
Southern Boulevard Parkway is a landscaped segment of south Broad Street in Philadelphia, Pennsylvania connecting Marconi Plaza and FDR Park from Oregon Avenue at Broad Street southward five intersections to the gateway entrance of the Philadelphia Navy Yard. The parkway consists of the central median landscaped area including the bordering east and west tree lined sidewalks and various sized green spaces which separates opposing lanes of traffic, and roadway intersections. Broad Street itself is a historic city street and this landscaped segment is bordered by an urban residential townhome community and the entrance to the major venues of the South Philadelphia Sports Complex and Xfinity Live!, and the Philadelphia Navy Yard.

In 1904, a plan for a Park and Parkway Improvements in South Philadelphia began with Samuel Parsons Jr. laying out a design, but work stopped by 1910. Then in 1912, the city's director of public works, Morris Cooke, engaged the preeminent landscape architecture firm, Olmsted Brothers, to produce designs for League Island Park, Oregon Plaza and the stretch of south Broad Street from Oregon Avenue south to Pattison Avenue and southward to League Island. The unifying medial green space including the tree lined sidewalks on the east and west connected the two parks developed from river swamp lands that were filled and regraded. In 1926 a second Parkway was constructed on Moyanmensing Avenue from Oregon Avenue to the intersection of Packer Avenue, and Packer Avenue was extended from 20th Street to Broad Street (Southern Boulevard) for access to the Sesquicentennial Exposition. Later the two parks were renamed Marconi Plaza and FDR Park and the median landscaping known as the Southern Boulevard.

Olmsted's design was centered on the availability of open space to all residents. Olmsted wanted to create a place that took advantage of the best characteristics that the city and the country had to offer. The intended result was to create a "Suburban Village" by blending the countryside with the urban environments and developing an organization of open space, views and providing the advantages of increased health benefits of "purity of air" and "facilities for quiet out-of-door recreation". This original concept design facilitated surrounding development in the next 100 years of a thriving urban residential community, countryside recreation and the focal location point for regional metropolitan spectator sporting events.

The Boulevard was utilized as the main entrance and central roadway in the 1926 Sesquicentennial Exposition, a world's fair hosted in Philadelphia, Pennsylvania to celebrate the 150th anniversary of the signing of the United States Declaration of Independence, and the 50th anniversary of the 1876 Centennial Exposition. Open green areas, parking, and huge exposition buildings flanked the Boulevard lined with linden trees and flowering crab apple trees, individual obelisks as the 13 columns for each of the original colony States known as the "Founders Pylons", various standards, banners and a huge 80 foot high 27 ton replica of the Liberty Bell at the gateway of Oregon Plaza. The Boulevard was illuminated at night with spectacular visual displays of the huge Liberty Bell surrounded with 26,000 light bulbs, the Founder Pylons each with a powerful searchlight projecting skyward, and the shooting projection of lights from the Tower Of Light. This provided a fantastic effect for that time period.

The structures were demolished  or removed following the close of the exposition, but the area continued to draw development in the 1960s with a new stadium, bowling alley, drive in movie theater, movie theater, and a major new Aquarium, Aquarama Aquarium Theater of the Sea. The development pattern continued with the centralized venues for professional sports in the form of Veterans Stadium and Spectrum which also have since been demolished and in 2012 now includes a complex of two Stadiums, one arena, and a new dining and entertainment district.

Although the thoroughfare carried the name of Broad Street the green space was officially designated in the 1950s Philadelphia Home Rule City Charter as part of the Fairmount Park urban park system as parkland, to be known as Southern Parkway. No traces of this name exist in this area today and it is merely referred to as part of Broad Street.

Cultural landmarks
Broad Street is home to several Philadelphia cultural landmarks. During the administration of Mayor Ed Rendell, Broad Street between Spruce and Market Streets, became known as the Avenue of the Arts, where it is home to art galleries, the Academy of Music, and the Kimmel Center. Two blocks north of City Hall is the Pennsylvania Academy of the Fine Arts, and further north is the New Freedom Theatre.

The South Philadelphia Sports Complex, near Broad's south end along Southern Boulevard Parkway, is the site of Citizens Bank Park, Lincoln Financial Field, and the Wells Fargo Center. Demolished sports facilities located in this area were John F. Kennedy Stadium, the Spectrum, and Veterans Stadium. As a result, the Philadelphia Flyers are nicknamed the "Broad Street Bullies".

South of the sports complex and interchanges with the Schuylkill Expressway (Interstate 76) and Interstate 95, Broad Street has its southern terminus in the former Philadelphia Naval Shipyard.

The former offices for The Philadelphia Inquirer and Philadelphia Daily News newspapers are on Broad Street just north of City Hall and the former PA State Building is at the intersection with Spring Garden Street. Most recently, the Public School District Administration relocated between these two landmarks.  Also located on North Broad at its intersection with Fairmount Avenue is the historic Divine Lorraine Hotel. Farther north, Broad passes through the campus of Temple University. Included on Temple's campus is the performing arts center, established in 1891. Once a Baptist temple, it has now become a prime part of the "Avenue of the Arts."

Where Broad Street intersects with Clearfield Street in North Philadelphia is the exact location of the 40th Parallel.

At the corner of Broad and W. Glenwood Ave is the former personal gym of heavyweight champion boxer, Joe Frazier. Having lived atop the gym for several years, it has now been turned into a furniture store.

Traditions and customs 
Broad Street often serves as the main parade route for Philadelphia sports championship parades, most recently for the Eagles Super Bowl LII victory. During the Phillies 2008 World Series victory parade, an estimated 2 million people lined Broad Street.

One of the busiest streets in the country, Broad Street is shut down for the annual  Broad Street Run. Passing by some of Philadelphia's most famous landmarks, the course averages over 35,000 participants a year. Additionally, the section of Broad Street from near Oregon Avenue (Marconi Plaza) to City Hall, in South Philadelphia and Center City, is the traditional location of the Mummers Parade on New Years Day.

Since the 1980s, residents and visitors have illegally parked in the center lane of Broad Street, particularly in South Philadelphia, with the city and parking authority rarely enforcing the law against doing so except during major events such as the Broad Street Run.

Public transportation

Public transportation along Broad Street includes SEPTA's Broad Street Line subway, which served an average of about 137,000 riders per weekday in 2010, running beneath Broad Street for most of its length. The subway starts at the Fern Rock Transportation Center in the Fern Rock neighborhood in North Philadelphia and begins to follow Broad Street at the Olney Transportation Center, extending south through Center City to NRG station at Pattison Avenue in South Philadelphia. Several SEPTA City Bus routes run along Broad Street, with Routes  and  following Broad Street for most of their routes. The Route 4 bus follows Broad Street from Pattison Avenue in South Philadelphia north to Rising Sun Avenue in North Philadelphia, where it diverges to the east to head to the Fern Rock Transportation Center. The Route 16 bus follows Broad Street from Philadelphia City Hall north to its terminus at Cheltenham Avenue, where the bus route continues west along Cheltenham Avenue to the Cheltenham-Ogontz Bus Loop.

Other names

 "Avenue of the Arts" (from Glenwood Avenue to Washington Avenue). This section of Broad Street includes many prominent theater and concert halls, including the Academy of Music, Kimmel Center for the Performing Arts, Merriam Theater, Wilma Theater, University of the Arts Gershman Hall, and Suzanne Roberts Theater.  The street has "AA" lights all along the way, which is the abbreviation for Avenue of the Arts.
 Avenue of the States: from Washington Avenue to Oregon Avenue. Along this section of Broad Street fly the flags of all 50 states in the US.
 Southern Boulevard Parkway: from Oregon Avenue south to Pattison Avenue to the Gatehouse of the Philadelphia Navy Yard connecting Marconi Plaza and FDR Park, an Olmsted Brothers landscape design 1904-1916 and fully utilized as the center roadway for the 1926 Sesquicentennial Exposition world's fair celebrating the birthday of the United States.
 C. A. Tindley Boulevard: from South Street to Washington Avenue. This was dedicated to the late Charles A. Tindley, the father of gospel music. Tindley Temple United Methodist Church was his home, at the corner of Broad and Fitzwater Streets.
 Georgie Woods Boulevard: from Diamond Street to York Street.
 Used to be part of PA 291, from Moyamensing Avenue north to City Hall.

Major intersections
The entire street is in Philadelphia, Philadelphia County.

Historic buildings, places, and sites

Broad Street Historic District (Philadelphia, Pennsylvania)
E.A. Wright Bank Note Company, 2527-37 North Broad Street, Philadelphia, Pennsylvania, 1913
2301-03 N. Broad Street, Philadelphia, Pennsylvania, 1895
2305-07 N. Broad Street, Philadelphia, Pennsylvania, 1895

References

External links

Economy of Philadelphia
Lincoln Highway
National Register of Historic Places in Philadelphia
Roads on the National Register of Historic Places in Pennsylvania
Streets in Philadelphia